Wyscig pokoju – Warszawa-Berlin-Praga is a Polish-East German film based on the Peace Race. It was released in 1952.

External links
 

1952 films
East German films
1950s Polish-language films
Polish documentary films
Documentary films about cycling
Documentary films about Poland
Documentary films about Germany
1952 documentary films
1950s German films